The Borgu Game Reserve is a section of the Kainji National Park, in the Borgu Local Government Area of Niger State and Baruten Local 
Government Area of Kwara State, Nigeria.
It is bordered on the east by Kainji Lake and reaches almost to the border with Benin to the west, covering . It was amalgamated with the Zugurma Game Reserve in 1975 to form the Kainji Lake National Park.

References

Game Reserves of Nigeria
Kwara State
Niger State